Bertram Lamb Pearson CB DSO MC (1893–17 August 1984) was a senior British civil servant at the Ministry of Education in the 1940s and 1950s.

Biography

Born in 1893, Bertram Lamb Pearson was educated at Wakefield Grammar School, at Bedford School and at The Queen's College, Oxford.  He was Principal Private Secretary to the Permanent Secretary at the Board of Education between 1924 and 1928, Principal Private Secretary to the President of the Board of Education between 1937 and 1946, and Under Secretary at the Ministry of Education between 1946 and 1955.

Bertram Lamb Pearson died on 17 August 1984.

References

1893 births
1984 deaths
People educated at Bedford School
Alumni of The Queen's College, Oxford
Companions of the Order of the Bath